The Federal Bureau of Investigation (FBI) operates 56 field offices in major cities throughout the United States. Many of these offices are further subdivided into smaller resident agencies that have jurisdiction over a specific area. These resident agencies are considered to be part of the primary field offices. FBI headquarters, located in Washington, D.C., controls the flow of the agents and support staff that work out of the field offices across the country. Each field office is overseen by a Special Agent in Charge (SAC), except those located in Los Angeles, New York City, and Washington, D.C., which due to their large size are each managed by an Assistant Director in Charge (ADIC), assisted by SACs responsible for specific programs or departments. The FBI also have offices overseas otherwise known as legal attaches. The FBI international offices are usually in American Embassies.

Alabama 
 Birmingham: Serves the counties of Bibb, DeKalb, Lauderdale, St. Clair, Blount, Etowah, Lawrence, Shelby, Calhoun, Fayette, Limestone, Sumter, Cherokee, Franklin, Madison, Talladega, Clay, Greene, Marion, Tuscaloosa, Cleburne, Jackson, Marshall, Walker, Colbert, Jefferson, Morgan, Winston, Cullman, Lamar and Pickens.  Four Resident Agencies in Florence, Gadsden, Huntsville and Tuscaloosa.
 Mobile: Serves the counties of Autauga, Coffee, Geneva, Monroe, Baldwin, Conecuh, Hale, Montgomery, Barbour, Coosa, Henry, Perry, Bullock, Covington, Houston, Pike, Butler, Crenshaw, Lee, Randolph, Chambers, Dale, Lowndes, Russell, Chilton, Dallas, Macon, Tallapoosa, Choctaw, Elmore, Marengo, Washington, Clarke, Escambia, Mobile and Wilcox. Resident Agencies in Auburn, Dothan, Monroeville, Montgomery, and Selma.

Alaska 
 Anchorage: Entire state. Resident Agencies in Fairbanks and Juneau.

Arizona 
 Phoenix: All counties except part of the Navajo Nation within Apache County which is served by Albuquerque, New Mexico. Resident agencies in Flagstaff, Lake Havasu City, Lakeside, Sierra Vista, Tucson, and Yuma.

Arkansas 
 Little Rock: Entire state. Resident agencies in El Dorado, Fayetteville, Fort Smith, Hot Springs, Jonesboro, Marion, Pine Bluff and Texarkana.

California 
 Los Angeles: Serves the counties of Los Angeles, Orange, San Bernardino, San Luis Obispo, Santa Barbara, Riverside, and Ventura.  Resident Agencies in Lancaster, LAX, Long Beach, Orange, Palm Springs, Riverside, Santa Maria, Ventura, Victorville and West Covina. Located inside the Wilshire Federal Building.
 Sacramento: Serves Yosemite National Park and the counties of Alpine, Amador, Butte, Calaveras, Colusa, El Dorado, Fresno, Glenn, Inyo, Kern, Kings, Lassen, Madera, Merced, Mariposa, Modoc, Mono, Nevada, Placer, Plumas, Sacramento, San Joaquin, Shasta, Sierra, Siskiyou, Solano, Stanislaus, Sutter, Tehama, Trinity, Tulare, Tuolumne, Yolo, and Yuba.  Resident agencies in Bakersfield, Chico, Fairfield, Fresno,  Redding, South Lake Tahoe, and Stockton
 San Diego:  Serves the counties of Imperial and San Diego.  Resident agencies in Imperial and North County.
 San Francisco: Serves the counties of: Alameda, Contra Costa, Del Norte, Humboldt, Lake, Marin, Mendocino, Monterey, Napa, San Benito, San Francisco, Santa Clara, Santa Cruz, San Mateo and Sonoma.  Resident agencies in Concord, Fortuna, Monterey Bay, Oakland, Palo Alto, San Jose and Santa Rosa.

Colorado 
 Denver: Serves all counties and the state of Wyoming.  Resident agencies in Casper, Cheyenne, Colorado Springs, Durango, Fort Collins, Glenwood Springs, Grand Junction, Jackson Hole, Lander and Pueblo.

Connecticut 
 New Haven: Entire state.  Resident agencies in Bridgeport, Meriden and New London.

Florida 
 Jacksonville: Serves the counties of Alachua, Baker, Bay, Bradford, Calhoun, Citrus, Clay, Columbia, Dixie, Duval, Escambia, Flagler, Franklin, Gadsden, Gilchrist, Gulf, Hamilton, Holmes, Jackson, Jefferson, Lafayette, Lake, Leon, Levy, Liberty, Madison, Marion, Nassau, Okaloosa, Putnam, St. Johns, Santa Rosa, Sumter, Suwannee, Taylor, Union, Volusia, Wakulla, Walton, and Washington. Resident agencies in Daytona Beach, Fort Walton Beach, Gainesville, Ocala, Panama City, Pensacola, and Tallahassee.
 Miami (Miramar): Serves the counties of Broward, Highlands, Indian River, Monroe, Palm Beach, Miami-Dade, Martin, Okeechobee, and St. Lucie. Resident agencies in Fort Pierce, Homestead, Key West and West Palm Beach.
 Tampa : Serves the counties of Brevard, Charlotte, Collier, De Soto, Glades, Hardee, Hendry, Hernando, Hillsborough, Lee, Manatee, Orange, Osceola, Pasco, Pinellas, Polk, Sarasota, and Seminole. Resident agencies in Clearwater, Fort Myers, Lakeland, Melbourne, Naples, Orlando and Sarasota.

Georgia 
 Atlanta:  Entire state.  Resident agencies in Albany, Athens, Augusta, Brunswick, Columbus, Dalton, Gainesville, Hartsfield-Jackson International Airport, Macon, Rome, Savannah, Statesboro, Thomasville and Valdosta.

Hawaii 
 Honolulu (Kapolei): Serves all counties, the US territories of American Samoa, and Guam, and the Northern Marianas.  Resident agencies in Kona, Maite, Saipan, and Wailuku

Illinois 
 Chicago: Serves the counties of Boone, Grundy, La Salle, Whiteside, Carroll, Jo Daviess, Lee, Will, Cook, Kane, McHenry, Winnebago, De Kalb, Kendall, Ogle, Du Page, Lake, and Stephenson.  Resident agencies in Lisle, Orland Park, Rockford, and Schaumburg.
 Springfield: Adams, Brown, Cass, Christian, DeWitt, Greene, Logan, Macon, Macoupin, Mason, Menard, Montgomery, Morgan, Pike, Sangamon, Schuyler, Scott, Champaign, Clark, Coles, Crawford, Cumberland, Douglas, Edgar, Ford, Iroquois, Jasper, Kankakee, Moultrie, Piatt, Shelby, Vermilion, Bond, Calhoun, Clinton, Effingham, Fayette, Jersey, Madison, Marion, Monroe, Randolph, St. Clair, Washington, Alexander, Clay, Edwards, Franklin, Gallatin, Hamilton, Hardin, Jackson, Jefferson, Johnson, Lawrence, Massac, Perry, Pope, Pulaski, Richland, Saline, Union, Wabash, Wayne, White, Williamson, Fulton, Hancock, Livingston, Marshall, McDonough, McLean, Peoria, Putnam, Tazewell, Woodford, Bureau, Henderson, Henry, Knox, Mercer, Rock Island, Stark, and Warren. Resident agencies in Champaign, Decatur, Fairview Heights, Marion, Peoria and Quad Cities.

Indiana 
 Indianapolis: Entire state. Resident agencies in Bloomington, Evansville, Fort Wayne, Lafayette, Merrillville, Muncie, New Albany, South Bend and Terre Haute.

Kentucky 
 Louisville: Entire state. Resident agencies in Bowling Green, Covington, Hopkinsville, Lexington, London, Owensboro, Paducah and Pikeville.

Louisiana 
 New Orleans: Entire state. Resident agencies in Alexandria, Baton Rouge, Lafayette, Lake Charles, Monroe and Shreveport.

Maryland 
 Baltimore (Windsor Mill): Serves all counties and the state of Delaware. Resident agencies in Annapolis, Bel Air, Calverton, Dover, Frederick, Rockville, Salisbury, and Wilmington.

Massachusetts 

 Boston (Chelsea): Serves all counties and the states of Maine, New Hampshire, and Rhode Island. Resident agencies in Augusta, Bangor, Bedford (NH), Lakeville (MA), Lowell (MA), Portland (ME), Portsmouth, Springfield, Providence (RI) and Worcester.

Michigan 
 Detroit: Entire state. Resident agencies in Ann Arbor, Bay City, Clinton Township, Flint, Grand Rapids, Kalamazoo, Lansing, Marquette, St. Joseph, Traverse City and Troy.

Minnesota 
 Minneapolis (Brooklyn Center): Serves all counties and the states of North Dakota and South Dakota. Fifteen resident agencies, in Aberdeen, Bemidji, Bismarck, Duluth, Fargo, Grand Forks, Mankato, Minot, Pierre, Rapid City, Rochester, Sioux Falls, St. Cloud and St. Paul.

Mississippi 
 Jackson: Entire state. Resident agencies in Columbus, Gulfport, Hattiesburg, Meridian, Oxford, Pascagoula, and Southaven.

Missouri 
 Kansas City: Serves all of Kansas and the Missouri counties of Andrew, Allyson, Atchison, Barry, Barton, Bates, Benton, Boone, Buchanan, Caldwell, Callaway, Camden, Carroll, Cass, Cedar, Christian, Clay, Clinton, Cole, Cooper, Dade, Dallas, Daviess, De Kalb, Douglas, Gentry, Georgetown, Greene, Grundy, Hayden, Harrison, Henry, Hickory, Holt, Howard, Howell, Jackson, Jasper, Johnson, Laclede, Lafayette, Lawrence, Livingston, McDonald, Mercer, Miller, Moniteau, Morgan, Newton, Nodaway, Oregon, Osage, Ozark, Penington, Pettis, Platte, Polk, Pulaski, Putnam, Ray, Saline, Shaw, St. Clair, Stone, Sullivan, Taney, Texas, Vernon, Webster, Worth and Wright. Resident agencies in Garden City, Jefferson City, Joplin, Manhattan, St. Joseph, Springfield, Topeka and Wichita.
 St. Louis: The city of St. Louis and the counties of Adair, Audrain, Bollinger, Butler, Cape Girardeau, Carter, Chariton, Clark, Crawford, Dent, Dunklin, Franklin, Gasconad, Iron, Jefferson, Knox, Lewis, Lincoln, Linn, Macon, Madison, Maries, Marion, Mississippi, Monroe, Montgomery, New Madrid, Pemiscot, Perry, Phelps, Pike, Ralls, Randolph, Reynolds, Ripley, Sainte Geneviev, Schuyler, Scotland, Scott, Shannon, Shelby, St. Charles, St. Francois, St. Louis, Stoddard, Warren, Washington and Wayne. Resident agencies in Cape Girardeau, Kirksville and Rolla.

Nebraska 
 Omaha: Serves all counties and the state of Iowa. Resident agencies in Cedar Rapids, Des Moines, Grand Island, Lincoln, North Platte, Quad Cities, Sioux City and Waterloo.

Nevada 
 Las Vegas: Entire state. Resident agencies in Elko, Reno and Stateline.

New Jersey 
 Newark: Serves 19 counties.  Camden, Gloucester, and Salem counties are handled by the Philadelphia field office.  Resident agencies in Atlantic City, Franklin Township, Paterson, Red Bank and Trenton.

New Mexico 
 Albuquerque: Serves all counties and the Navajo Nation. Resident agencies in Farmington, Gallup, Las Cruces, Roswell and Santa Fe.

New York 

 Albany: Serves all of Vermont and the New York Counties of Albany, Broome, Cayuga, Chenango, Clinton, Columbia, Cortland, Delaware, Essex, Franklin, Fulton, Greene, Hamilton, Herkimer, Jefferson, Lewis, Madison, Montgomery, Oneida, Onondaga, Oswego, Otsego, Rensselaer, Saratoga, Schenectady, Schoharie, St. Lawrence, Tioga, Tompkins, Ulster, Warren and Washington. Resident agencies in Binghamton, Burlington, Ithaca, Plattsburgh, Rutland, Syracuse and Utica.
 Buffalo : Serves the counties of Allegany, Cattaraugus, Chautauqua, Chemung, Erie, Genesee, Livingston, Monroe, Niagara, Ontario, Orleans, Schuyler, Seneca, Steuben, Wayne, Wyoming and Yates. Resident agencies in Elmira, Jamestown and Rochester.
 New York City (Jacob K. Javits Federal Building): Serves the City of New York (counties of the Bronx, New York, Richmond, Queens & Kings) and the counties of Dutchess, Nassau, Orange, Putnam, Rockland, Suffolk, Sullivan and Westchester. Resident agencies in Brooklyn, Goshen, JFK Airport, Melville and Rye (formerly located in White Plains).

North Carolina 
 Charlotte: Entire state. Resident agencies in Asheville, Fayetteville, Greensboro, Greenville, Hickory, Raleigh, and Wilmington.

Ohio 

 Cincinnati: (FBI Cincinnati Field Office): Serves the counties of Adams, Athens, Belmont, Brown, Butler, Champaign, Clark, Clermont, Clinton, Coshocton, Darke, Delaware, Fairfield, Fayette, Franklin, Gallia, Greene, Guernsey, Hamilton, Harrison, Highland, Hocking, Jackson, Jefferson, Knox, Lawrence, Licking, Logan, Madison, Meigs, Miami, Monroe, Montgomery, Morgan, Morrow, Muskingum, Noble, Perry, Pickaway, Pike, Preble, Ross, Scioto, Shelby, Union, Vinton, Warren, and Washington. Resident agencies in Athens, Cambridge, Columbus, Dayton and Portsmouth.
 Cleveland (FBI Cleveland Field Office):  Serves the counties of Allen, Fulton, Mahoning, Seneca, Ashland, Geauga, Marion, Stark, Ashtabula, Hancock, Medina, Summit, Auglaize, Hardin, Mercer, Trumbull, Carroll, Henry, Ottawa, Tuscarawas, Columbiana, Holmes, Paulding, Van Wert, Crawford, Huron, Portage, Wayne, Cuyahoga, Lake, Putnam, Williams, Defiance, Lorain, Richland, Wood, Erie, Lucas, Sandusky, and Wyandot. Resident agencies in Akron, Canton, Lima, Mansfield, Painesville, Sandusky, Toledo and Youngstown.

Oklahoma 
 Oklahoma City: Entire state. Resident agencies in Ardmore, Durant, Elk City, Lawton,  Muskogee, Norman, Stillwater, Tulsa and Woodward.

Oregon 
 Portland: Entire state. Resident agencies in Bend, Eugene, Medford, Pendleton and Salem.

Pennsylvania 
 Philadelphia: Serves the Pennsylvania counties of Adams, Berks, Bradford, Bucks, Cameron, Carbon, Centre, Chester, Clinton, Columbia, Cumberland, Delaware, Dauphin, Franklin, Fulton, Huntingdon, Juniata, Lackawanna, Lancaster, Lebanon, Lehigh, Luzerne, Lycoming, Mifflin, Monroe, Montour, Montgomery, Northampton, Northumberland, Perry, Philadelphia, Pike, Potter, Schuylkill, Snyder, Sullivan, Susquehanna, Tioga, Union, Wayne, and Wyoming, and the New Jersey counties of Camden, Gloucester, and Salem. Eight resident agencies, in Allentown, Cherry Hill, Fort Washington, Harrisburg, Newtown Square, Scranton, State College and Williamsport.
 Pittsburgh: Serves all of West Virginia and the Pennsylvania counties of Allegheny, Armstrong, Beaver, Bedford, Blair, Butler, Cambria, Clarion, Clearfield, Crawford, Elk, Erie, Fayette, Forest, Green, Indiana, Jefferson, Lawrence, McKean, Mercer, Somerset, Venango, Warren, Washington, and Westmoreland. Ten resident agencies, in Beckley, Charleroi, Charleston, Clarksburg, Cranberry Township, Erie, Huntington, Johnstown, Martinsburg and Wheeling.

Puerto Rico 
 San Juan: Serves Puerto Rico and the U.S. Virgin Islands (two US territories) with resident agencies in Aguadilla, Fajardo, and Ponce, in Puerto Rico and St. Croix and St. Thomas in the U.S. Virgin Islands.

South Carolina 

 Columbia : Entire state. Regional offices in Aiken, Charleston, Florence, Greenville, Hilton Head, Myrtle Beach, Rock Hill and Spartanburg.

Tennessee 
 Knoxville: Serves the counties of Anderson, Bedford, Bledsoe, Blount, Bradley, Campbell, Carter, Claiborne, Cocke, Coffee, Franklin, Grainger, Greene, Grundy, Hamblen, Hamilton, Hancock, Hawkins, Jefferson, Johnson, Knox, Lincoln, Loudon, Marion, McMinn, Meigs, Monroe, Moore, Morgan, Polk, Rhea, Roane, Scott, Sequatchie, Sevier, Sullivan, Unicoi, Union, Van Buren, Warren, and Washington. Resident agencies in Chattanooga, Johnson City, Oak Ridge and Tullahoma
 Memphis: Serves the counties of Benton, Cannon, Carroll, Cheatham, Chester, Clay, Crockett, Cumberland, Davidson, DeKalb, Decatur, Dickson, Dyer, Fayette, Fentress, Gibson, Giles, Hardeman, Hardin, Haywood, Henderson, Henry, Hickman, Houston, Humphreys, Jackson, Lake, Lauderdale, Lawrence, Lewis, Macon, Madison, Marshall, Maury, McNairy, Montgomery, Obion, Overton, Perry, Pickett, Putnam, Robertson, Rutherford, Shelby, Smith, Stewart, Sumner, Tipton, Trousdale, Wayne, Weakley, White, Williamson and Wilson. Resident agencies in Clarksville, Columbia, Cookeville, Jackson, and Nashville.

Texas 
 Dallas: Serves the counties of: Dallas, Allen, Ellis, Kaufman, Navarro, Brown, Callahan, Eastland, Fisher, Haskell, Howard, Jones, Mills, Mitchell, Nolan, Shackelford, Stephens, Stonewall, Taylor, Throckmorton, Armstrong, Briscoe, Carson, Castro, Childress, Collingsworth, Dallam, Deaf Smith, Donley, Gray, Hall, Hansford, Hartley, Hemphill, Hutchinson, Lipscomb, Moore, Ochiltree, Oldham, Parmer, Potter, Randall, Roberts, Sherman, Swisher, Wheeler, Comanche, Erath, Hood, Johnson, Palo Pinto, Parker, Tarrant, Wise, Collin, Denton, Hunt, Rockwall, Bailey, Brown, Cochran, Crosby, Dawson, Dickens, Floyd, Gaines, Garza, Hale, Hockley, Kent, lamb, Lubbock, Lynn, Motley, Scurry, Terry, Yoakum, Angelina, Houston, Nacogdoches, Polk, Sabine, San Augustine, Shelby, Trinity, Tyler, Brown, Coke, Coleman, Concho, Crockett, Glasscock, Irion, Menard, Reagan, Runnels, Schleicher, Sterling, Sutton, Tom Green, Cooke, Delta, Fannin, Grayson, Lamar, Bowie, Camp, Cass, Franklin, Hopkins, Morris, Red River, Titus, Anderson, Cherokee, Gregg, Harrison, Henderson, Marion, Panola, Rains, Rusk, Smith, Upshur, Van Zandt, Wood, Archer, Baylor, Clay, Cottle, Foard, Hardeman, Jack, King, Knox, Montague, Wichita, Wilbarger and Young.  Twelve resident agencies, in Abilene, Amarillo, DFW Airport, Fort Worth, Frisco, Lubbock, Lufkin, San Angelo, Sherman, Texarkana, Tyler and Wichita Falls.
 El Paso: Serves the counties of: El Paso, Culberson, Hudspeth, Andrews, Brewster, Crane, Ector, Jeff Davis, Loving, Martin, Midland, Pecos, Presidio, Reeves, Upton, Ward and Winkler. Two resident agencies, in Alpine and Midland.
 Houston: Serves the counties of: Harris, Hardin, Jasper, Jefferson, Liberty, Newton, Orange, Austin, Brazos, Colorado, Fayette, Grimes, Madison, Waller, Montgomery, San Jacinto, Walker, Aransas, Bee, Brooks, Duval, Jim Wells, Kenedy, Kleburg, Live Oak, Nueces, San Patricio, Brazoria, Chambers, Fort Bend, Galveston, Matagorda, Wharton, Calhoun, Goliad, DeWitt, Jackson, Lavaca, Refugio and Victoria. Six resident agencies, in Beaumont, Bryan,  Corpus Christi and Texas City.
 San Antonio: Serves the counties of: Atascosa, Bandera, Bexar, Comal, Frio, Gillespie, Gonzalez, Guadalupe, Karnes, Kendall, Kerr, Kimble, Mason, Medina, Real, Uvalde, Wilson, Bastrop, Blanco, Burleson, Burnett, Caldwell, Hays, Lampasas, Lee, Llano, McCullough, San Saba, Travis, Washington, Williamson, Cameron, Willacy, Dimmitt, Edwards, Kinney, Maverick, Terrell, Val Verde, Zavala, Jim Hogg, LaSalle, McMullen, Webb, Zapata, Hidalgo, Starr, Bell, Bosque, Coryell, Falls, Freestone, Hamilton, Hill, Leon, Limestone, McLennan, Milam and Robertson. Six resident agencies, in Austin, Brownsville, Del Rio, Laredo, McAllen and Waco.

Utah 
 Salt Lake City: Serves all counties and the states of Idaho and Montana. Resident agencies in Billings, Boise, Bozeman, Coeur d'Alene, Glasgow, Great Falls, Havre, Helena, Kalispell, Lewiston, Missoula, Monticello, Ogden, Pocatello, Provo, Shelby, St. George and Vernal.

Virginia 
 Norfolk: Serves Fort Monroe and the counties of Accomack, Gloucester, Isle of Wight, James City, Mathews, Northampton, Southampton, and York, plus the independent cities of Chesapeake, Franklin, Hampton, Newport News, Norfolk, Portsmouth, Virginia Beach and Williamsburg. One resident agency, in Newport News
 Richmond: Serves Dahlgren Naval Center, Fort A. P. Hill and all cities and counties not covered by either the Norfolk or Washington, D.C. office. Resident agencies in Bristol, Charlottesville, Fredericksburg, Lynchburg, Roanoke, and Winchester.

Washington 
 Seattle: Entire state. Resident agencies in Bellingham, Everett, Olympia, Silverdale, Spokane, Tacoma, Tri-Cities, Vancouver and Yakima.

Washington, D.C. 

 Washington, D.C.: District of Columbia and the Navy Annex, plus the Virginia counties of  Fauquier, Arlington, Prince William, Fairfax (City and County) and Loudoun. It also serves cities and towns including Quantico, Warrenton, Falls Church, Alexandria, Manassas, Leesburg and Vienna. One resident agency, in Manassas.

Wisconsin 
 Milwaukee: Entire state. Resident agencies in Eau Claire, Green Bay, La Crosse, Madison and Wausau.

See also 
 List of ATF field divisions
 List of United States Secret Service field offices

References

External links 

 FBI—Listing by State

 
Local government-related lists